At least two ships of the Pakistan Navy have been named Dacca:

 , a  launched as HMIS Oudh in 1942 she was transferred to Pakistan and renamed in 1948. She was discarded by 1959
 , a  replenishment oiler launched as Mission Santa Clara in 1944 she was transferred to Pakistan and renamed in 1963 

Pakistan Navy ship names